Home spun literally refers to hand spinning, see spinning (textiles).

Homespun may refer to:
 Homespun fabric, especially that worn by American colonists who were boycotting British goods 
 "Homespun", pseudonym of Benjamin Franklin in The Hasty-Pudding etc.
 Prudentia Homespun pseudonym of Jane West, English novelist, poet, playwright
 Homespun (Winchester, Virginia) also known as the Bell House, is a historic home located near Winchester, Frederick County, Virginia.
 Homespun, 1913 short silent film with Richard Travers

Music
 Homespun Records, original record company of Rick Cassidy started in 1967 
 Homespun (band), English pop/folk band formed in 2003 by Dave Rotheray
 Homespun (XTC album), demo tape by XTC, same track list as Apple Venus Volume 1
 Homespun (Homespun album) 2003 debut album by Homespun
 Homespun Music Instruction, started by Happy Traum in 1967

See also
A Homespun Vamp, a 1922 American drama silent film directed by Frank O'Connor starring May McAvoy